You've Got a Date with the Blues is an album by vocalist Helen Merrill, recorded for the MetroJazz label in 1958.

Reception 

The AllMusic review by Scott Yanow states: "Helen Merrill dates are always something special. This set for Metrojazz, which has been reissued as a Verve CD, matches the cool-toned yet inwardly heated singer with an all-star sextet." Recommended."

Track listing
 "The Blues from Black, Brown, and Beige" (Duke Ellington) – 5:22
 "Am I Blue?" (Harry Akst, Grant Clarke) – 3:32
 "Blue Gardenia" (Bob Russell and Lester Lee) – 3:18
 "You've Got a Date with the Blues" (Leonard Feather) – 3:28
 "The Thrill Is Gone" (Lew Brown, Ray Henderson) – 3:35
 "(Ah, the Apple Trees) When the World Was Young" ( Philippe-Gérard, Johnny Mercer) – 3:08
 "Blues in My Heart" (Benny Carter) – 3:37
 "Vous M'Eblouissez (You Go to My Head)" (J. Fred Coots, Louis Hennevé, Louis Palex) – 3:23
 "Lorsque Tu M'Embrasses (Just Squeeze Me)" (Ellington, Jacques Plante) – 2:46
 "The Meaning of the Blues" (Bobby Troup, Leah Worth) – 3:05
 "Signing Off" (Feather) – 1:32

Personnel
Helen Merrill – vocals
Kenny Dorham – trumpet (tracks 1 & 3)
Jerome Richardson (tracks 1–4, 8, 10 & 11), Frank Wess (tracks 5–7 & 9) − tenor saxophone, flute
Jimmy Jones – piano, arranger
Barry Galbraith – guitar
Al Hall (tracks 2, 8, 10 & 11), Milt Hinton (tracks: 1, 3, 4–7 & 9) – bass
Johnny Cresci – drums

References

1959 albums
Helen Merrill albums
MetroJazz Records albums
Verve Records albums